Smarty is a web template system written in PHP. Smarty is primarily promoted as a tool for separation of concerns.
Smarty is intended to simplify compartmentalization, allowing the front-end of a web page to change separately from its back-end. Ideally, this lowers costs and minimizes the efforts associated with software maintenance.

Smarty generates web content through the placement of special Smarty tags within a document. These tags are processed and substituted with other code. Tags are directives for Smarty that are enclosed by template delimiters. These directives can be variables, denoted by a dollar sign ($), functions, logical or loop statements. Smarty allows PHP programmers to define custom functions that can be accessed using Smarty tags.

Smarty example 
Since Smarty separates PHP from HTML, there are two files — one contains the presentation code: an HTML template, including Smarty variables and tags - {$title_text|escape} {$body_html} - which might look like this:
<!DOCTYPE html>
<html lang="en">
<head>
   <meta charset="utf-8">
   <title>{$title_text|escape}</title>
</head>

<body> {* This is a little comment that won't be visible in the HTML source *}
{$body_html}
</body> <!-- this is a little comment that will be seen in the HTML source -->
</html>

The business logic to use the Smarty template above could be as follows:
define('SMARTY_DIR', 'smarty-2.6.22/');
require_once(SMARTY_DIR . 'Smarty.class.php');

$smarty = new Smarty();
$smarty->template_dir = './templates/';
$smarty->compile_dir = './templates/compile/';

$smarty->assign('title_text', 'TITLE: This is the Smarty basic example ...');
$smarty->assign('body_html', '<p>BODY: This is the message set using assign()</p>');

$smarty->display('index.tpl');

Further reading

See also 

 Comparison of web template engines
 Web template

References

External links
 

Free software programmed in PHP
Template engines